t zero (original title:  Ti con zero) is a 1967 collection of short stories by Italian author Italo Calvino. The title story is based on a particularly uncertain moment in the life of a lion hunter.  This second in time, t0, is considered by the hunter against known previous seconds (t−1, t−2, ...) and hypothetical future seconds (t1, t2, ...)

"Qfwfq" (an always extant being introduced in Cosmicomics) narrates the first set of stories in the collection, each of which takes a scientific fact and builds a story around it.  Other stories in the book diverge to a greater or lesser degree from this scientific theme.  The final story in the collection is a postmodern pastiche of Alexandre Dumas' The Count of Monte Cristo.

The book was also published in English with the title Time and the Hunter in 1970.

All of the stories in t zero, together with those from Cosmicomics and other sources, are now available in a single volume collection, The Complete Cosmicomics (Penguin UK, 2009).

References

 Italo Calvino. t zero (Translated from Italian by William Weaver).  New York: Harcourt, Brace & World, 1969. 

1967 short story collections
Short story collections by Italo Calvino
Science fiction short story collections